Souhrudam is a 1991 Indian Malayalam-language film directed by Shaji Kailas and written by Kaloor Dennis. The film stars Mukesh, Urvashi, Sai Kumar and Parvathy. The film has musical score by Shyam.

Plot
The story is about two newly wed couples living as neighbours. While the wives are close friends, husbands suspect that their wives have an extramarital affair with the other husband.

Cast

Mukesh as Roychen
Urvashi as Shainy Roy
Parvathy as Sreedevi Rajmohan
Sai Kumar as Rajmohan
V. D. Rajappan as Narayanan
Kanakalatha as Mrs. Menon
Jagathi Sreekumar as Mathachan
Kalpana as Annamma
Baiju as Reji
Sukumaran as Adv. James Samuel
Adoor Bhavani as Karthiyaniamma
Jagannatha Varma 
Jagannathan as Krishnan
Kollam Thulasi
Philomina as Kathrina Chedathi
Saritha as Annie James Samuel
Kunchan as Broker Sunderashan 
Praseetha Menon as Sreelakshmi
Mamukkoya as Usthad Usman

Soundtrack
The music was composed by Shyam and the lyrics were written by Chunakkara Ramankutty.

References

External links
 

1991 films
1990s Malayalam-language films
Films directed by Shaji Kailas